The World Heart Federation (WHF) is a non-governmental organization based in Geneva, Switzerland, formed in 1978. WHF is recognized by the World Health Organization as its leading NGO partner in cardiovascular disease prevention.

History 

The World Heart Federation was formed in 1978 by a merger of the International Society of Cardiology and the International Cardiology Federation, under the name of the International Society and Federation of Cardiology. In 1998, this body changed its name to the World Heart Federation.

The World Heart Federation represents more than 200 organizations in over 100 countries.  It's the leading organization in championing global cardiovascular health, with the mission of enabling people across the globe to gain access to the information, care and treatment they need in order to keep their hearts healthy. 

The World Heart Federation is the only CVD organization in official relations with the World Health Organization.

Congresses & events 

The World Heart Federation hosts the World Congress of Cardiology. The first World Congress of Cardiology was convened in Paris in September 1950 under the aegis of the International Society of Cardiology, which had itself been founded four years previously.

In 2000, World Heart Day was founded to inform people around the globe that cardiovascular disease (CVD) is the world’s leading cause of death.  World Heart Day is the world's biggest awareness-raising platform for CVD, celebrated every year on 29 September.

In 2016, the World Heart Federation hosted the first Global Summit on Circulatory Health, held in Mexico City. The World Heart Summit is a thought leadership event designed to elevate CVD as the top priority for key opinion leaders, Ministers of Health, public health officials, and industry leaders. In 2021, the Global Summit was renamed the World Heart Summit.

Global Advocacy 

Strategically located in Geneva, the seat of the World Health Organization (WHO), WHF advocates at the highest levels to bring CVD to the forefront of the global health agenda. Their partnership with WHO enables them to share their knowledge and goals around cardiovascular disease, primarily in key areas like tobacco and air pollution, as well as neglected conditions such as rheumatic heart disease and Chagas disease.

References

External links 
World Heart Federation Official Website

International medical and health organizations
Scientific supraorganizations